Holy Rosary Church was a parish erected in 1844 in the small community of Manton (also known as Blincoe) in Washington County, Kentucky, United States.  The church was built under the direction of the Dominicans.

Parish and worship space origination
The cornerstone for Holy Rosary Church, a Roman Catholic church in Manton was laid November 2, 1844.  The original church is not the one that is on this site.  A few years later, in 1848, a new church was built.  This, the present building, was blessed on November 19, 1848.  The building was built of brick with an overall size of 20 x 60 feet.

Pastors
One of the first pastors was Rev. Julian Timoleum Pieters.  Records also show Fr. Edward Lynch was an early pastor, who was stationed at Holy Cross between 1866 and 1883.  The current parish administrator is Fr. Matthew Hardesty. The new and current pastor is, 
Fr. Michael Martin.

The parish today
In 1883, a church was built at nearby Fredericktown (also known as 'the Burg').  The parish is a mission church to one at Fredericktown, Kentucky.  The parish is within the Diocese of Louisville.  There are about 200 parishioners.

This historic building is listed in the National Register of Historic Places.

References

External links

Diocese listing of parish
Panoramio View

Roman Catholic churches completed in 1844
19th-century Roman Catholic church buildings in the United States
National Register of Historic Places in Washington County, Kentucky
Roman Catholic churches in Kentucky
Roman Catholic Archdiocese of Louisville
Churches in Washington County, Kentucky
1844 establishments in Kentucky